David Huddleston is an evangelical minister and Christian author born in Harrodsburg, Kentucky on October 15, 1943. He has preached and ministered in more than 100 places in North America, Europe, and the Caribbean and is the author of Life's Spiritual Instruction Book and Spiritual Jetstreams.

Huddleston is an alumnus of the University of Kentucky and Asbury Theological Seminary. He holds Master of Divinity and Doctor of Theology degrees and is a former Boeing 727 pilot with Eastern Air Lines where he flew extensively throughout Latin America and the Caribbean while based in Miami, Florida.

Early years
The third oldest of four children of James Irvin Huddleston Sr. and Lucile Gabhart Huddleston, David Huddleston grew up in Harrodsburg, Kentucky, where he attended the Methodist Church.

Family
David and his wife of 50 years, Edie Huddleston, have two children and live in Louisville, KY.

Bibliography
 Life's Spiritual Instruction Book (1994)
 Spiritual Jetstreams (2003)
 "Heart Talk", monthly Christian advice column in The Christian Voice (2000–2001).

References

External links

Candler School of Theology at Emory University alumni

People from Harrodsburg, Kentucky
Religious leaders from Louisville, Kentucky
Christian writers
University of Kentucky alumni
Asbury Theological Seminary alumni
1943 births
Living people
Commercial aviators
20th-century Christians
21st-century Christians
20th-century American non-fiction writers
21st-century American non-fiction writers
American Christian writers
American evangelicals